Furkan Aydogdu (born June 6, 1988) is a Turkish footballer who plays as an attacking midfielder for SK Wullersdorf.

External links
 
 
 Furkan Aydogdu at ÖFB

1988 births
Living people
People from Terme
Austrian footballers
Turkish footballers
Turkish emigrants to Austria
Austrian people of Turkish descent
Association football midfielders
First Vienna FC players
FC Lustenau players
SV Ried players
TSV Hartberg players
Floridsdorfer AC players
Sarıyer S.K. footballers
FC Mauerwerk players
SC Ostbahn XI players
Austrian Football Bundesliga players
2. Liga (Austria) players
TFF Second League players